Al-Yoosuf Mosque is a mosque in Eydhafushi, Baa, Maldives opened in the 1970s, accommodating more than 210 worshippers.

See also
 Islam in the Maldives
 History of Maldives

External links
National Centre for Linguistic and Historical Research (Maldives)

Mosques in the Maldives
Mosques completed in the 1970s